is a Japanese mass media corporation headquartered in Shibuya, Tokyo. The company manufactures and distributes various types of products, including movies, music videos and television commercials, using new technologies such as augmented reality, virtual reality, 3D computer graphics, and panoramic photography.

Establishment
Founded in 2007, the company operates as film and television producers. It has opened several subsidiary studios throughout years and firmed business alliance with Japanese media corporation Toei Company since 2019.

Subsidiaries

References

External links
  
 

 
Japanese companies established in 2007
Mass media companies based in Tokyo
Mass media companies established in 2007
Shibuya